The  is a six-man tag team title contested for in the Japanese professional wrestling promotion Tenryu Project. The title was established in Wrestle Association R (WAR) in 1994.

There have been a total of twenty reigns shared among sixteen teams and thirty-five wrestlers. Kenichiro Arai, Kohei Sato and Masayuki Kono are the current champions in their first reign, both individually and as a team.

Title history

Inaugural tournament
Genichiro Tenryu had the idea for the WAR World 6-Man Tag Team Championship from his stay in World Championship Wrestling, where he held the NWA World Six-Man Tag Team Championship with The Road Warriors during the time he elevated to the top of All Japan Pro Wrestling. On June 30, 1994, an eight-team single elimination tournament was held in Sendai to crown the inaugural champions. The tournament saw Fuyuki-gun (Hiromichi Fuyuki, Gedo and Jado) defeat Animal Hamaguchi, Genichiro Tenryu and Koki Kitahara in the final.

This title was essentially WAR's main championship, as it drew both heavyweights and junior heavyweights for competition. The promotion closed in 2000, and the title was abandoned.

Revivals
Genichiro Tenryu revived the title in 2010, for his new Tenryu Project promotion, as the Tenryu Project World 6-Man Tag Team Championship. It was disbanded when Tenryu closed the promotion after his retirement on November 15, 2015.

The title was reactivated in July 2021 and a four-team tournament was held between January and February 2022 to crown new champions.

Reigns

Combined reigns

By team

By wrestler

References

Notes

Footnotes

External links
Wrestling-Titles.com

WAR (wrestling promotion) championships
Trios wrestling tag team championships
Tenryu Project championships